Patricia Ann Irizarry (born February 8, 1965) is an American former soccer player who played as a defender, making two appearances for the United States women's national team.

Career
She played youth soccer for the Dartmouth Darts, the Dartmouth Dolls, Sparta Soccer Club, and the Richardson Sting of Richardson, Texas. She also played volleyball for the Richardson Junior High Falcons in 1979.

Irizarry made her international debut for the United States on July 7, 1987 in a friendly match against Canada. She earned her second and final cap for the U.S. on July 29, 1988 in a friendly match against France.  In 1987, she also participated at the U.S. Olympic Festival in Durham, North Carolina, playing for the Olympic South women's soccer team.

Personal life
Irizarry is a native of Richardson, Texas, and attended Lloyd V. Berkner High School. She attended Texas A&M University before later going to the North Texas State University, where she received a Bachelor of Business Administration in 1987. She later received a Bachelor of Science in Nursing from the University of Texas at Arlington in 1995, and a Master of Science in Nursing from Texas Woman's University in 2002. She currently works as a nurse practitioner.

Career statistics

International

References

1965 births
Living people
People from Richardson, Texas
Soccer players from Texas
American women's soccer players
United States women's international soccer players
Women's association football defenders
Advanced practice registered nurses
American women nurses
Texas A&M University alumni
University of North Texas alumni
University of Texas at Arlington alumni
Texas Woman's University alumni
21st-century American women